Tuberculous cellulitis is a skin condition resulting from infection with mycobacterium, and presenting as cellulitis.

See also 
 Lupus vulgaris
 Metastatic tuberculous abscess or ulceration
 Miliary tuberculosis
 Skin lesion

References 

Mycobacterium-related cutaneous conditions